This is a family tree of all the Eastern Roman Emperors who ruled in Constantinople. Most of the Eastern emperors were related in some form to their predecessors, sometimes by direct descent or by marriage. From the Doukid dynasty (1059) onwards all emperors are related to the same family.

Dynasty names are given in capitals so that they can be picked out from the interweaving trees. Junior co-emperors who never exercised real power are shown in a smaller font to distinguish them from the reigning emperor.

286–518
This is a simplified family tree centered solely around the Eastern Empire, for a fuller list that includes both Eastern and Western emperors, see Family tree of Roman emperors

518–711

{{Tree chart| | | | | | | | | | | | |Hec| |Tic| |Co4
 |Hec={{Small|Heraclius}}
 |Tic=

717–1453

See also

 Family tree of Roman emperors
 List of Roman emperors
 List of Byzantine emperors
 History of the Byzantine Empire
 Byzantine Empire under the Constantinian and Valentinianic dynasties
 Byzantine Empire under the Theodosian dynasty
 Byzantine Empire under the Leonid dynasty
 Byzantine Empire under the Justinian dynasty
 Byzantine Empire under the Heraclian dynasty
 Twenty Years' Anarchy
 Byzantine Empire under the Isaurian dynasty
 Byzantine Empire under the Amorian dynasty
 Byzantine Empire under the Macedonian dynasty
 Byzantine Empire under the Doukas dynasty
 Byzantine Empire under the Komnenos dynasty
 Byzantine Empire under the Angelos dynasty
 Laskarid dynasty (Empire of Nicaea)
 Grand Komnenos (Empire of Trebizond)
 Komnenos Doukas (Empire of Thessalonica)
 Byzantine Empire under the Palaiologos dynasty

References
 

Byzantine monarchs
Family tree
Byzantine monarchs
Descent from antiquity